In the following we solve the second-order differential equation called the hypergeometric differential equation using Frobenius method, named after Ferdinand Georg Frobenius. This is a method that uses the series solution for a differential equation, where we assume the solution takes the form of a series. This is usually the method we use for complicated ordinary differential equations.

The solution of the hypergeometric differential equation is very important. For instance, Legendre's differential equation can be shown to be a special case of the hypergeometric differential equation. Hence, by solving the hypergeometric differential equation, one may directly compare its solutions to get the solutions of Legendre's differential equation, after making the necessary substitutions. For more details, please check the hypergeometric differential equation.

We shall prove that this equation has three singularities, namely at x = 0, x = 1 and around x = infinity. However, as these will turn out to be regular singular points, we will be able to assume a solution on the form of a series.  Since this is a second-order differential equation, we must have two linearly independent solutions.

The problem however will be that our assumed solutions may or not be independent, or worse, may not even be defined (depending on the value of the parameters of the equation). This is why we shall study the different cases for the parameters and modify our assumed solution accordingly.

The equation 
Solve the hypergeometric equation around all singularities:

Solution around x = 0 
Let

Then

Hence, x = 0 and x = 1 are singular points.  Let's start with x = 0.  To see if it is regular, we study the following limits:

Hence, both limits exist and x = 0 is a regular singular point.  Therefore, we assume the solution takes the form

with a0 ≠ 0. Hence,

Substituting these into the hypergeometric equation, we get

That is,

In order to simplify this equation, we need all powers to be the same, equal to r + c − 1, the smallest power.  Hence, we switch the indices as follows:

Thus, isolating the first term of the sums starting from 0 we get

Now, from the linear independence of all powers of x, that is, of the functions 1, x, x2, etc., the coefficients of xk vanish for all k. Hence, from the first term, we have

which is the indicial equation. Since a0 ≠ 0, we have

Hence,

Also, from the rest of the terms, we have

Hence,

But

Hence, we get the recurrence relation

Let's now simplify this relation by giving ar in terms of a0 instead of ar−1.  From the recurrence relation (note: below, expressions of the form (u)r refer to the Pochhammer symbol).

As we can see,

Hence, our assumed solution takes the form

We are now ready to study the solutions corresponding to the different cases for c1 − c2 = γ − 1 (this reduces to studying the nature of the parameter γ: whether it is an integer or not).

Analysis of the solution in terms of the difference γ − 1 of the two roots

γ not an integer 
Then y1 = y|c = 0 and y2 = y|c = 1 − γ.  Since

we have

Hence,   Let A′ a0 = a and B′ a0 = B.  Then

γ = 1 
Then y1 = y|c = 0.  Since γ = 1, we have

Hence,

To calculate this derivative, let 

Then

But

Hence,

Differentiating both sides of the equation with respect to c, we get:

Hence, 

Now,

Hence,

For c = 0, we get

Hence, y = C′y1 + D′y2.  Let C′a0 = C and D′a0 = D.  Then

γ an integer and γ ≠ 1

γ ≤ 0

To begin with, we shall simplify matters by concentrating a particular value of 
 and generalise the result at a later stage.
We shall use the value  . The indicial equation

that when  that that denominator has a factor  
which vanishes when  . In this case, a solution can be obtained by
putting  where  is a constant.

With this substitution, the coefficients of  vanish when
The factor of 
in the denominator of the recurrence relation cancels with that of the numerator
when . Hence, our solution takes the form

If we start the summation at  rather than 
we see that

The result (as we have written it) generalises easily. 
For , with  then

Obviously, if , then . 
The expression for  we have just given looks a little
inelegant since we have a multiplicative constant apart from 
the usual arbitrary multiplicative constant .
Later, we shall see that we can recast things in such a way 
that this extra constant never appears

this gives us (apart from a multiplicative constant) the same result
as found using . 
This means we must take the partial derivative (w.r.t. ) of the usual trial solution in order to find a second independent solution.
If we define the  linear 
operator  as

then since  in our case,

(We insist that .) Taking the partial derivative w.r.t ,

Note that we must evaluate the partial derivative at  
(and not at the other root  ). Otherwise the right hand side
The factor 
This part of the second independent solution is

Now we can turn our attention to the terms where the factor  cancels.
First

After this, the recurrence relations give us

So, if  we have

We need the partial derivatives

Similarly, we can write

and

It becomes clear that for 

Here,  is the th partial sum of the harmonic series,

Putting these together, for the case 
we have a second solution

is a positive integer) are then

and

The general solution is as usual 
Now, if the reader consults a ``standard solution" for this case,
such as given by Abramowitz and Stegun  in §15.5.21
(which we shall write down at the end of the next section) it shall be found that the
 solution we have found looks somewhat different from the standard solution.
the  infinite series part of  
The first term in the corresponding infinite
The  term is missing from the standard solution.
Nonetheless, the two solutions are entirely equivalent.

The "Standard" Form of the Solution γ ≤ 0 

The reason for the apparent discrepancy between the solution
given above and the standard solution in Abramowitz and Stegun 
§15.5.21 is that there are an infinite number of
ways in which to represent the two independent solutions of the hypergeometric ODE.
In the last section, for instance, we replaced 
Suppose though, we are given some function
 which is continuous and finite everywhere in an arbitrarily
Suppose we are also given

 and 

Then, if instead of replacing 
with  we replace 
the hypergeometric equation. Clearly, we have an infinity of possibilities
Suppose that   is the first non zero term
If we make  the reciprocal
 as we did in the previous section. From another point of
view, we get the same result if we ``insist" that  is independent of
, and find  by using the recurrence relations
backwards.

For the first  solution,
the function  gives us (apart from multiplicative constant)
the same 
as we would have obtained using .
Suppose that using  gives rise to two independent solutions
In the following we shall

The second solution requires us to take the partial derivative w.r.t ,
and substituting the usual trial solution gives us

The operator  is the same linear operator discussed in the previous section. 

Evaluating the left hand side at  will give us a second independent solution.
Note that this second solution  is in fact a linear

 
We shall review the special case where  that was considered in the last section. If we ``insist" , then the recurrence relations yield

and

taking the partiial derivative w.r.t , we denote the sum of the
three terms involving these coefficients as 
 where

The reader may confirm that we can tidy this up and make it easy to generalise by putting

Next we can turn to the other coefficients, the recurrence relations yield

Setting  gives us

Now, to find  we need partial derivatives

Then

we can re-write this as

The pattern soon becomes clear, and for 

Now we can write (disregarding the arbitrary constant) for

Some authors prefer to express the finite sums in this last result using the
digamma function . In particular, the following results are used

Here,  is the Euler-Mascheroni constant. Also

With these results we obtain the form given in Abramamowitz and Stegun §15.5.21, namely

The Standard" Form of the Solution γ > 1

In this section, we shall concentrate on the ``standard solution", and
We shall put  where .
For the root  of the indicial equation we had

where  in which case we are in trouble if .
For instance, if , the denominator in the recurrence relations
We can use exactly the same methods that we have just used for the standard solution in the last
section. We shall not (in the  instance where ) 
will not give us the standard form of solution that we are after.
Rather, we shall ``insist" that  as we did
(Recall that this defined the function  and
as functions of  using the recurrence relations backwards.
There is nothing new to add here, and the reader may use
the same methods as used in the last section to find
the results of §15.5.18 and §15.5.19,
these are

and

so that this sum diverges as

Solution around x = 1 
Let us now study the singular point x = 1.  To see if it is regular, 

Hence, both limits exist and x = 1 is a regular singular point.  Now, instead of assuming a solution on the form

we will try to express the solutions of this case in terms of the solutions for the point x = 0.  We proceed as follows: we had the hypergeometric equation

Let z = 1 − x.  Then

Hence, the equation takes the form

Since z = 1 − x, the solution of the hypergeometric equation at x = 1 is the same as the solution for this equation at z = 0.  But the solution at z = 0 is identical to the solution we obtained for the point x = 0, if we replace each γ by α + β − γ + 1.  Hence, to get the solutions, we just make this substitution in the previous results. For x = 0, c1 = 0 and c2 = 1 − γ.  Hence, in our case, c1 = 0 while c2 = γ − α − β.  Let us now write the solutions.  In the following we replaced each z by 1 - x.

Analysis of the solution in terms of the difference γ − α − β of the two roots
To simplify notation from now on denote γ − α − β by Δ, therefore γ = Δ + α + β.

Δ not an integer

Δ = 0

Δ is a non-zero integer

Δ > 0

Δ < 0

Solution around infinity 
Finally, we study the singularity as x → ∞.  Since we can't study this directly, we let x = s−1.  Then the solution of the equation as x → ∞ is identical to the solution of the modified equation when s = 0. We had

 
Hence, the equation takes the new form

which reduces to

Let

As we said, we shall only study the solution when s = 0. As we can see, this is a singular point since P2(0) = 0.  To see if it is regular,

Hence, both limits exist and s = 0 is a regular singular point. Therefore, we assume the solution takes the form

with a0 ≠ 0. Hence,

Substituting in the modified hypergeometric equation we get

And therefore:
 

i.e.,

In order to simplify this equation, we need all powers to be the same, equal to r + c, the smallest power. Hence, we switch the indices as follows

Thus, isolating the first term of the sums starting from 0 we get

Now, from the linear independence of all powers of s (i.e., of the functions 1, s, s2, ...), the coefficients of sk vanish for all k. Hence, from the first term we have

which is the indicial equation. Since a0 ≠ 0, we have

Hence, c1 = α and c2 = β.

Also, from the rest of the terms we have

Hence,

But

Hence, we get the recurrence relation

Let's now simplify this relation by giving ar in terms of a0 instead of ar−1.  From the recurrence relation,

As we can see,

Hence, our assumed solution takes the form

We are now ready to study the solutions corresponding to the different cases for c1 − c2 = α − β.

Analysis of the solution in terms of the difference α − β of the two roots

α − β not an integer
Then y1 = y|c = α and y2 = y|c = β.  Since 

we have 

Hence, y = A′y1 + B′y2. Let A′a0 = A and B′a0 = B.  Then, noting that s = x−1,

α − β = 0
Then y1 = y|c = α. Since α = β, we have

Hence,

To calculate this derivative, let

Then using the method in the case γ = 1 above, we get

Now, 

Hence,

Therefore:

Hence, y = C′y1 + D′y2. Let C′a0 = C and D′a0 = D. Noting that s = x−1,

α − β an integer and α − β ≠ 0

α − β > 0
From the recurrence relation

we see that when c = β (the smaller root), aα−β → ∞.  Hence, we must make the substitution a0 = b0(c − ci), where ci is the root for which our solution is infinite. Hence, we take a0 = b0(c − β) and our assumed solution takes the new form

Then y1 = yb|c = β. As we can see, all terms before

vanish because of the c − β in the numerator.

But starting from this term, the c − β in the numerator vanishes. To see this, note that

Hence, our solution takes the form

Now,

To calculate this derivative, let

Then using the method in the case γ = 1 above we get

Now,

Hence,

Hence,

At c = α  we get y2. Hence, y = E′y1 + F′y2. Let E′b0 = E and F′b0 = F. Noting that s = x−1 we get

α − β < 0
From the symmetry of the situation here, we see that

References

 

Hypergeometric functions
Ordinary differential equations
Modular forms